Hugo Christophe Bargas (born 22 October 1986) is a French professional footballer who plays as a forward and was recently signed by Club Deportivo FAS in Primera División de Fútbol de El Salvador.

Club career
Born in Le Puy-en-Velay through a French mother and an Argentine father, Bargas moved to Argentina at early age, and graduated from All Boys' youth setup. He made his senior debut on 29 September 2007, scoring the last of a 5–0 home routing over CA San Telmo in the Primera B Metropolitana.

Bargas appeared 20 times and scored four goals during the 2007–08 campaign, as his side were promoted to the Primera B Nacional. On 1 September 2008 he moved abroad, joining Eredivisie side De Graafschap.

Bargas played his first match as a professional on 14 September, coming on as a second-half substitute in a 1–0 home win against Vitesse Arnhem. After appearing only three times in the season, all from the bench, he was loaned to FC Zwolle in January 2009, until June.

Bargas subsequently returned to De Graafschap, being an undisputed starter as his side was crowned champions of 2009–10 Eerste Divisie, scoring 16 goals in the process. In July 2011 he returned to All Boys, with the club now in the Primera División.

On 22 January 2012, after appearing in only four matches, Bargas signed a six-month contract with Spanish Segunda División club Gimnàstic de Tarragona. He made his debut seven days later, replacing Fernando Morán in the 52nd minute of a 1–2 home loss against UD Almería.

On 20 April, Bargas rescinded with the Catalans, placed in the relegation zones. In June 2012 he signed a one-year deal with Bolivian side Club Blooming.

On 9 July of the following year, after being Blooming's top scorer in the campaign, Bargas joined fierce rivals Oriente Petrolero. After starting rarely he rescinded his link in January 2014, and switched teams and countries again, signing for Italian Lega Pro Prima Divisione side U.S. Cremonese.

On 19 June 2014 Bargas moved to Ecuador, joining Deportivo Cuenca. On 8 January 2015 Bargas signed a one-year contract with Blooming for his second spell with the club. On 12 August 2015 Blooming won its first Copa Cine Center thanks to two goals netted by Bargas in 4-0 victory over Wilstermann in the final game.

On 28 January 2017, Bargas signed for Neftchi Baku of the Azerbaijan Premier League. In October 2017, Bargas extended his contract with Neftchi Baku for another six-months, until the end of the 2017–18 season, however this was terminated by mutual consent on 9 January 2018.

Borges announced on 31 July 2019 that he had joined Kuwaiti club Al-Yarmouk SC. However, he announced a few weeks later that he would leave the club again due to a contractual issue. He ended up returning to Argentina and joined Central Norte on 27 August 2019.

Honours
All Boys
Primera B Metropolitana: 2007-08
De Graafschap
Eerste Divisie: 2009-10
Blooming
Copa Cine Center: 2015

Personal life
He is the son of Argentina international footballer Ángel Bargas, who participated in the 1974 FIFA World Cup.

References

External links
 Hugo Bargas at BDFA.com.ar 
 

1986 births
Living people
Footballers from Lyon
French people of Argentine descent
Sportspeople of Argentine descent
French footballers
French expatriate footballers
All Boys footballers
De Graafschap players
PEC Zwolle players
Gimnàstic de Tarragona footballers
Club Blooming players
Oriente Petrolero players
U.S. Cremonese players
C.D. Cuenca footballers
Neftçi PFK players
Deportivo Madryn players
Central Norte players
Azerbaijan Premier League players
Segunda División players
Torneo Federal A players
Bolivian Primera División players
Ecuadorian Serie A players
Serie C players
Argentine Primera División players
Eredivisie players
Eerste Divisie players
Primera B Metropolitana players
Expatriate footballers in Argentina
Expatriate footballers in the Netherlands
Expatriate footballers in Spain
Expatriate footballers in Bolivia
Expatriate footballers in Italy
Expatriate footballers in Ecuador
Expatriate footballers in Azerbaijan
Expatriate footballers in Kuwait
Association football forwards
French expatriate sportspeople in Azerbaijan
Kuwait Premier League players
Al-Yarmouk SC (Kuwait) players
French expatriate sportspeople in Kuwait
French expatriate sportspeople in Italy
French expatriate sportspeople in Bolivia
French expatriate sportspeople in Spain
French expatriate sportspeople in Ecuador
French expatriate sportspeople in the Netherlands